Robert Singer (born in 1956 in Chernivtsi, Ukraine) is the Chairman for the Center for Jewish Impact, a former Israeli government official, a Jewish organization leader and a businessman. Singer served as the chief executive officer and Executive-Vice President of the World Jewish Congress from May 2013 until July 2019, the most senior professional of the international Jewish NGO.

On May 24, 2019 Singer was confirmed as Chair of the Board of Trustees of World ORT.

In 2019, Robert founded Spero Impact Solutions, an impact investment and consulting firm, and is currently serving as its Chairman and CEO. Spero runs business portfolios of companies, funds and governments through the identification and management of investments and philanthropic projects in Israel and abroad.

In 2020, Robert established the Center for Jewish Impact, under the vision of becoming a focal point and center for excellence for innovative and impactful initiatives that deliver benefit to Israel and the Jewish world.

On a voluntary basis as Chairman, Robert leads the NGO's SASA Setton (an Israeli philanthropic social organization that leads education for hospitalized children in Israel) and Alumot Or (an Israeli philanthropic social organization that promotes and implements excellence programs in special education schools).

Education and personal life
Singer moved to Israel from Ukraine with his family at the age of 15. He graduated with a Bachelor of Arts from Tel Aviv University in 1976. In 1996, he was awarded a Master of Science in Management Engineering from the University of Bridgeport, Connecticut. Between 2005 and 2008, he completed several executive management courses at Harvard Business School and Columbia Business School. Singer is married to Anna, and they have twin daughters.

Asked in an article published in the magazine Jewish Life about what motivated him, he once said that given that he had been born into a family of refuseniks in Ukraine he was encapsulated by an "unrelenting desire to assist Jews and gentiles with economic and educational development, enabling them to  find a way out of the most dire of circumstances." Singer added: "Moving to Israel with my family at the age of 15 was the initial catalyst for me being motivated to invest myself wholeheartedly in helping to develop projects for educational and economic development in Israel and the Jewish community worldwide.”

Professional career

Center for Jewish Impact

Singer founded the Center for Jewish Impact in 2020, along with senior leaders and professionals of the Jewish world, under the vision of becoming a focal point and center for excellence for innovative and impactful initiatives that deliver benefit to Israel and the Jewish world.

Their approach is to effectively implement innovative projects that deliver tangible results to all stakeholders, and strategically focusing on the issues of education, supporting Israel, Israel-diaspora Jewry relations, interfaith dialogue and combatting anti-Semitism.

The operating principles are pragmatic and result-oriented, in order to forgo bureaucratic hurdles, thus prioritizing action over discussion. Using a vast network of partners, contacts and donors, the Center for Jewish Impact is able to tailor projects to various needs of the Jewish community at large.

The Center for Jewish Impact has participated in a UN briefing regarding international efforts of combatting anti semitism, is working with Krakow Humanitarian Relief, teamed up with Maccabi Tel Aviv Basketball for events in Europe, attended an interfaith dialogue in Athens, etc. In his role as Chairman of the Center for Jewish Impact, and Senior Adviser to the Movement for the Fight Against Antisemitism, Robert Singer was one of the main organizers of the Balkan Anti-Semitism Forum held on October 28, 2020, in collaboration with the Albanian Parliament, CAM and the Zionist Organization. Likewise, Robert Singer was one of the main organizers for America for Israel, which took place on July 29, 2021, and the Kyiv Forum, which took place on December 15–16, 2021. Additionally, there was a briefing with Facebook regarding the events with the EU envoy to the Middle East, Mortinos, and UNAOC.

Israeli government and World ORT

Between 1976 and 1987, Singer served in the Israel Defense Forces (IDF), including as senior educational officer, an assignment he said which had allowed him "to gain a tremendous amount of life experience, maturity and perspective."

From 1987 to 1999, Singer held positions within the Israeli Prime Minister’s Office, serving under the Prime Ministers Yitzhak Shamir, Yitzhak Rabin, Shimon Peres, and Benjamin Netanyahu.

Prior to joining the World Jewish Congress, Singer worked for 14 years as Director General and CEO of World ORT, the world's largest Jewish education and vocational training network.

World Jewish Congress

In January 2013, it was announced that Singer would assume the top professional position at the World Jewish Congress which until then was that of Secretary-General but changed to Chief Executive Officer and Executive Vice-President when Singer took over at the WJC Plenary Assembly in Budapest in May 2013.

In his speech to the delegates in Budapest, Singer said to "every anti-Semite, every neo-Nazi, every anti-Israel: we are watching you, we are hearing you, we are reading you, and we will not allow you to continue spreading hatred and bigotry. We Jews are united, and we will prevail."

In his CEO Report to the WJC Executive Committee meeting in Paris in March 2014, Singer highlighted a number of structural changes to the organization, notably the creation of a new WJC Program Department, the opening of a WJC representative office in Washington, DC, to strengthen relations with the US government, and the revival of the historic WJC office in Geneva The Jewish Diplomatic Corps, established in 2006 by the organization and for some years an independent body, was reintegrated into the World Jewish Congress structure in 2013 and is now part of the WJC Program Department. Special emphasis was given to the WJC's presence on social networking sites such as Facebook. The International Council of Jewish Parliamentarians and the Israel Council on Foreign Relations, which operate under the auspices of the World Jewish Congress, were also restructured.

On behalf of the WJC, Singer also made a number of policy statements. He notably expressed alarm that companies would profit from surging digital sales of Adolf Hitler's book "Mein Kampf". Singer told ABC News that "[w]hile the academic study of Mein Kampf is certainly legitimate, the spike in ebook sales likely comes from neo-Nazis and skinheads idolizing the greatest monster in history," and added: "We think that responsible companies shouldn't profiteer from the sales of hate books, or at least should donate the profits to help the victims of anti-Semitism, racism and other like bigotries."

Following the 2014 Gaza conflict and a subsequent surge in anti-Semitic activity, Singer urged European governments to "strengthen police protection of Jewish sites and to ban or disband violent rallies." He urged them to "stop the agitation and protect their Jewish populations, or Jews will ultimately turn their back on those countries. Jews live in Europe by right, not sufferance."

Addressing a pro-Israel rally in Stockholm, Sweden, on 31 August 2014, Singer declared: “Israel and its actions in Gaza are used as an excuse to besiege a synagogue in Paris, to shout ‘Jews to the gas’ on the streets of Berlin, or to attack people wearing a Jewish skullcap. None of this is acceptable, and it is high time that European leaders stand up against these expressions of antisemitism and take action.”

In September 2014, it was announced that the World Jewish Congress would play a leading role in preparing the commemorative events in Auschwitz marking the 70th anniversary of the liberation of the notorious Nazi death camp, in January 2015. In a press release, Singer said: "This will probably mark the last time that so many survivors will be able to join us at Auschwitz, and we must ensure that the unspeakable suffering they and many others had to endure at Auschwitz will not be forgotten once they are no longer among us."

Following the 2015 Copenhagen shootings, Singer traveled to Norway, Denmark, and Finland where he met with the leadership of Jewish communities as well as senior government officials.

In April 2015, he took part in a discussion on the future of Holocaust remembrance as part of the commemorative events marking the 70th anniversary of the liberation of the  Nazi concentration camp of Bergen-Belsen in Germany, and Singer then moderated a panel at the headquarters of the International Committee of the Red Cross (ICRC) in Geneva on the ICRC’s response to the Holocaust during World War II.

In June 2015, Singer addressed a demonstration outside the United Nations Human Rights Council in Geneva, telling the crowd of more than 1,000 Israel supporters that the Council “needs to overcome its obsession with Israel. This obsession is destructive and it stands in the way of an effective human rights policy that is so badly needed.”

During commemorations in Buenos Aires marking the 21st anniversary of the July 1994 bombing of the 1994 AMIA bombing, he criticized the lack of progress in bringing the perpetrators of that terrorist attack to justice.

Singer addressed the 75th anniversary of the Babi Yar massacre alongside Ukrainian President Poroshenko and German President Joachim Gauck in September 2016. The sole Ukrainian-Jewish speaker, Singer commended Ukraine for the resurgence of Jewish life and then reminded the world that the lessons of Babi Yar had not yet been learned.

In November 2018, Singer was awarded the Republic of Bulgaria’s First Degree Order of the Madara Horseman by President Rumen Radev in recognition of his efforts to strengthen ties between Bulgaria and the Jewish people.

As CEO of the World Jewish Congress, Singer has met with government, business, and civil society leaders such as US President Barack Obama, Pope Francis, French President François Hollande, Israeli Prime Minister Benjamin Netanyahu, Russian President Vladimir Putin, Turkish President Recep Tayyip Erdogan, French President Francois Hollande, Danish Justice Minister Mette Frederiksen, Belarusian Prime Minister Mikhail Myasnikovich, Chinese Minister of Overseas Affairs Qiu Yuanping, and Canadian Foreign Minister John Baird.

Robert Singer stepped down as CEO and Executive Vice-President of the World Jewish Congress in July 2019, however remained an advisor to the president of the organization until January 2020.

Honorary Volunteer, Leadership Roles, and Honorary Degrees
 Chairman of the Center for Jewish Impact (CJI)
 President and Chairman of the Board of Directors of SASA Setton
 Chairman of the Board of Trustees of World ORT
 Chairman of "Beams of Light" (Alumot Or)
 Member of the Combat Anti-Semitism Movement (CAM) Board of Governors  
 An honorary citizen of the Kiryat Yam Municipality
 Honorable citizen of the Lower Galilee Regional Council
 Chairman of the Steering Committee of the Bukovina Jewish Museum
 Chairman of ORT Lithuania
 Chairman of the Academic Committee of Anniere 2
 Governor of ORT BRAUDE - College of Engineering
 Honorary Degree Madara Horseman - from the President of Bulgaria
 Honorary Degree "Golden Map of Kosovo" - from the Prime Minister of Kosovo

References

Living people
1956 births
Israeli Jews
Israeli people of Ukrainian-Jewish descent
Columbia Business School alumni
Harvard Business School alumni
Tel Aviv University alumni
University of Bridgeport alumni